Rigler or Riegler is a surname. It may refer to:

Riegler
Adam Riegler (born 1998), American child actor
Alessandra Riegler (born 1961), Italian chess grandmaster
Christoph Riegler (born 1992), Austrian footballer
Claudia Riegler (snowboarder) (born 1973), snowboarder
Claudia Riegler (skier) (born 1976), Austrian skier
Elisabeth Riegler (born 1995), Austrian cyclist
Franz Riegler (footballer, born 1915) (known as Bobby; 1915–1989), Austrian international footballer
Franz Riegler (footballer, born 1922) (known as Franz Riegler II; 1922–1945), Austrian footballer who represented Germany internationally
Jan Marc Riegler (born 1988), Austrian footballer
Johann Riegler (1929–2011), Austrian international footballer

Rigler
Cy Rigler (1882–1935), American baseball umpire and coach
Eric Rigler, American player of the Uilleann pipes, Great Highland Bagpipes, and tin whistle
Franz Paul Rigler (1747/1748–1796), Austrian piano virtuoso, composer, teacher and theorist
Leo George Rigler (1896–1979), American radiologist
Lloyd Rigler (1915–2003), American businessman and philanthropist

See also
 Rigler's sign, named for Leo George Rigler